Dasht-e Naseri (also Romanized as Dasht-e Nāşerī; also known as Nāşerī) is a village in Vahdat Rural District, Mugarmun District, Landeh County, Kohgiluyeh and Boyer-Ahmad Province, Iran. At the 2006 census, its population was 132, in 25 families.

References 

Populated places in Landeh County